Letton is a village and former civil parish, now in the parish of Cranworth, in the Breckland district, in the county of Norfolk, England. It is situated near Shipdham and is about 5 miles south west of East Dereham. In 1931 the parish had a population of 83. On 1 April 1935 the parish was abolished and merged with Cranworth.

The main building in Letton is Letton Hall a Grade II listed building now used mainly as a religious holiday centre. The property was owned for many centuries by the Gurdon family. The former church of All Saints is now a ruin.

References

Villages in Norfolk
Former civil parishes in Norfolk
Breckland District